Kotyli (Kozluđa) is a former community in the Xanthi regional unit, East Macedonia and Thrace, Greece. Since the 2011 local government reform it is part of the municipality Myki, of which it is a municipal unit. The municipal unit has an area of 79.119 km2. Population 2,158 (2011). The community consists of the settlements Kotyli, Aimoni, Dimari and Pachni.

See also

List of settlements in the Xanthi regional unit

References

Populated places in Xanthi (regional unit)